Chiefdoms and sectors of the Democratic Republic of the Congo are administrative divisions of territories. They are further subdivided into groupings (of villages).  Chiefdoms are led by traditional leaders officially recognized by the government whereas sector chiefs are appointed directly by the government.

List of chiefdoms and sectors
The following is a list of all 470 sectors and 264 chiefdoms in the Democratic Republic of the Congo (734 total).

References

External links

 
Subdivisions of the Democratic Republic of the Congo
Congo, Democratic Republic of 3
Democratic Republic of the Congo geography-related lists